Open Source Lab may refer to:
 Open-Source Lab (book), a 2014 book by Joshua M. Pearce
 Boston Open Source Science Laboratory, a biology lab in Somerville, MA, United States
 UTEP Open Source Research Lab, a group-based violence study at the University of Texas at El Paso

See also 
 Open source (disambiguation)